The Futsal Thai League is the top league for futsal clubs in Thailand. It is sponsored by AIS and therefore officially known as the AIS Futsal Thai League.

Championship history

Broadcast

Digital new media

See also 
 Thailand national futsal team
 Football records in Thailand

References

2007 League Fixtures 
2007 League Club

External links
Official Website 
Football Association of Thailand 

Fut
Thai
Sports leagues established in 2006
2006 establishments in Thailand
Futsal competitions in Thailand
Professional sports leagues in Thailand